Bohusz is a surname. Notable people with the surname include:

 Adolf Szyszko-Bohusz (1883–1948), Polish architect
 Ignacy Bohusz (1720–1778), Polish-Lithuanian noble
 Zygmunt Bohusz-Szyszko (1893–1982), Polish general

See also
 Bogusz
 Bogusze (disambiguation)

Polish-language surnames